Fisher Island is a census-designated place in Florida.

Fisher Island, or Fishers Island, may also refer to:

Antarctica
 Fisher Island (Antarctica)

Australia
 Fisher Island (Queensland)
 Fisher Island (Tasmania)
 Fisher Island Reef, Tasmania

Canada
 Qikiqtaryuaq (Bathurst Inlet), formerly Fishers Island, Nunavut

Germany
 Fischerinsel, a neighbourhood in Berlin

USA
 Fisher Island (Florida), an island in Miami-Dade County, Florida
 Fisher Island (Montana), an island in the Missouri River
 Fishers Island, New York

See also
Fisherman Island (disambiguation)